Christopher John Tarrant,  (born 10 October 1946) is an English broadcaster, television personality and former radio DJ. He presented the ITV children's television show Tiswas from 1974 to 1981, and the game show Who Wants to Be a Millionaire? from 1998 to 2014. He was a Capital Radio host from 1984 to 2004. Tarrant received an OBE in 2004 for his charity work, in particular his campaigning on behalf of disadvantaged children.

Tarrant's career began in 1972, when he was hired by the since-dissolved television network ATV. He presented ATV Today, a current affairs programme serving the Midlands area of England, until 1982. Tarrant rose to prominence after becoming a co-host on Tiswas, the children's television show broadcast on a Saturday morning from 1974 to 1981. Tarrant was a member of the Four Bucketeers group, whose single "Bucket Of Water Song" reached No. 26 in the UK Singles Chart in 1980. In January 1982, along with Bob Carolgees, John Gorman, Randolph Sutherland and Lenny Henry, Tarrant launched a late-night show, O.T.T. ("Over the Top"), thought of as an "adult" version of Tiswas, which despite being short-lived, was very popular amongst adults. His co-host Sally James presented the concurrent and final series of Tiswas alone.

Tarrant was a Capital Radio host from 1984 to 2004, presenting the early-morning show Capital Breakfast. The show was highly popular, increasing Capital Radio's audience share in London. Tarrant presented the ITV game show Who Wants to Be a Millionaire? from 1998 to 2014, while also providing some audio recordings for some console games, and a tabletop game made by Tiger Electronics based on the show. He recorded a total of 592 episodes across 30 series, in which a total of five contestants won the cash prize of £1 million. Since Millionaire, Tarrant found successful presenting parts harder to come by, hosting a series of failed game shows for ITV. In 2012, Tarrant began a travel documentary series, Chris Tarrant: Extreme Railways, which has been compared with similar programmes presented by Michael Palin and Michael Portillo.

Early life
Chris Tarrant was born on Thursday, 10 October 1946 in Reading, England, to father Basil and mother Joan Tarrant. His father had joined a territorial unit of the Royal Army Ordnance Corps in 1936 and was among those evacuated from Dunkirk in the retreat of May 1940. He was also active in the Normandy landings. Tarrant was educated as a boarder in Choir House at the King's School, Worcester from 1960 to 1964. He represented the school at hockey and cricket and gained A, B and D grades at A-level in English, history and ancient history. He then studied English at the University of Birmingham, graduating in 1967.

Tarrant worked as a schoolteacher and also briefly as a film director for the Central Office of Information before joining ATV as a newsreader on ATV Today.

Career

Tiswas and O.T.T. 

Tarrant rose to prominence after becoming a co-presenter on Tiswas, a children's television show broadcast on a Saturday morning from January 1974 to 1981, alongside Sally James. It also featured the young Lenny Henry and occasionally Jim Davidson together with Bob Carolgees and his puppet, Spit the Dog. John Gorman, former member of The Scaffold, was also a presenter.

In 1982, he hosted the short-lived Saturday late-night show O.T.T. ("Over the Top"), which was billed as an adult version of Tiswas but was not such a success, though despite being short-lived, was very popular amongst adults. After this, Tarrant did a stint on the breakfast television station TV-am.

Capital Radio

In 1984, Tarrant joined Capital Radio as a presenter, initially presenting the station's Sunday lunchtime show before moving to a late-morning weekday slot, following David Jensen. From March 1987 until April 2004 he hosted Capital Breakfast. The show was highly popular, increasing Capital Radio's audience share in London. Tarrant had regular co-presenter Kara Noble (eventually replaced by Zabe Newsome for a very short duration) as his sidekick for the early years until Noble moved to Heart FM in 1995 with regular contributions from Flying Eye traffic reporter Russ Kane and newsreader Howard Hughes. It was on this show that he first coined his "Is that your final answer?" catchphrase.

At 9:00 am on 2 April 2004, after hosting 4,425 shows, 20 years on Capital Radio and giving away prizes to the value of £3.5 million, Tarrant said his farewell to the station.

Who Wants to Be a Millionaire?

Tarrant began hosting the television quiz show Who Wants to Be a Millionaire? in 1998. The format was sold to over 100 other countries. Tarrant coined the format's catchphrase, "But we don't want to give you that," and continued his older catchphrase, "Is that your final answer?", contributing it to the format. Tarrant presented the ITV game show Who Wants to Be a Millionaire? from 1998 to 2014, while also providing some audio recordings for some console games, and a tabletop game made by Tiger Electronics based on the show. He recorded a total of 592 episodes across 30 series, in which a total of five contestants won the cash prize of £1 million. 

One contestant, Charles Ingram, won the £1 million cash prize (and was declared by Tarrant as "the most amazing contestant we have ever, ever had") but was denied his winnings when it was determined that he had cheated. Tarrant attended the trial regarding the Ingram fraud case. When called to testify, he stated that he had not noticed anything amiss during the filming and had not heard any coughing. He said that following the win the Ingrams had been behaving "as normal as people who had just won £1m would be in that situation." Tarrant also said that he would not have signed the cheque if he had had suspicions of cheating and was "shocked" when he heard about the allegations. In subsequent interviews about the Ingram case, Tarrant has always insisted he was totally unaware of any coughing around him at the time of Ingram's run, but realised something wasn't right after viewing the tape afterwards. He has also said he was very sad about the whole situation, saying: "This was a very cynical plan, motivated by sheer greed. It is hugely insulting to the hundreds and hundreds of other contestants who have come on the show, just hoping for much smaller amounts of money but prepared to try and win their money honestly."

In July 2000, Tarrant signed a contract with ITV to present the show until December 2002. This contract was later extended to 2013. On 22 October 2013, Tarrant announced that, after fifteen years of hosting the programme, he would be leaving Who Wants to Be a Millionaire?, which consequently led ITV to axe the programme once his contract was finished; no more specials would be filmed after this announcement, leaving only those made before it to be aired as the final episodes. After the final celebrity editions, Tarrant hosted a clip show entitled "Chris' Final Answer", which aired on 11 February 2014 and ended the original series.

In 2018, ITV commissioned a new series of Who Wants to be a Millionaire?, to be presented by new host Jeremy Clarkson. In a television interview, Tarrant stated he had chosen not to watch the revived series, saying, "I did it for 15 years, about 600 shows. I loved it – I had a fantastic time but I don't want to do any more, so good luck. It’s a great show." Tarrant said he would have "politely turned down" an offer by the network to return to the show had he been approached.

In 2020, a TV mini-series, Quiz, about Ingram's attempt to win a million pounds on Who Wants to be a Millionaire? by cheating, was released. Tarrant was portrayed by the actor Michael Sheen.

Other work
Tarrant is known to have worked at Salford Royal Foundation Trust as a Hospital radio presenter.

Tarrant narrated the schools programme Stop, Look, Listen, made by ATV and later Central Television.

Tarrant hosted Everybody's Equal in 1989, although the programme came to an end in 1990 (the format was revived in 1997 by Channel 5 as Whittle, with Tim Vine as host). In 1991 he hosted the second series of Cluedo which was part panel quiz and part murder drama, based on the board game of the same name. On 1 January 1993, after Thames Television lost its ITV franchise and been replaced by Carlton Television, Tarrant hosted the first programme of the new contractor, A Carlton New Year. Also in 1993, Tarrant hosted Lose A Million, in which contestants started off with a (fictional) million pounds and were required to lose it by aiming to answer a set of questions incorrectly. Tarrant would later host Who Wants To Be A Millionaire?, in which the objective of the game is to do the opposite. From 1996 to 1999 Tarrant hosted the UK edition of Man O Man.

In 1994, Tarrant hosted a revival of Pop Quiz, previously hosted by Mike Read. It ran one series and eight episodes in total, airing again on Saturday nights (as Read's version did).

Tarrant was also the long-term host of Tarrant on TV, a programme which shows clips featuring a number of unusual television programmes from around the world. He presented the show from 1990 to 2006. In 1998, Tarrant released a compilation album entitled Ultimate Party Megamix on PolyGram Television's record label. A second edition entitled Ultimate Summer Party was also released. Both albums contain songs compiled by Tarrant himself in the form of a megamix.

In 2003, he did voice over work on the film Johnny English, where he starred as himself hosting a radio presentation of Sauvage's coronation. In 2008, he presented the game show It's Not What You Know on Challenge. In January 2009, Tarrant began hosting a new ITV show, The Colour of Money, which was cancelled after seven episodes after failing to perform well in the ratings.

In June 2008 it was announced he would return to radio, hosting a weekly Saturday morning show for the GMG Radio network of stations including London's 102.2 Smooth Radio, Real Radio in Scotland and the North West's Century Radio. The show would air in direct competition to Jonathan Ross's show on BBC Radio 2 and began on 26 July. It was aired for 12 months until July 2009.

In 2009, UKTV signed Tarrant to present a show for Watch called Tarrant Lets the Kids Loose. The eight-part series, beginning on 4 October, gave three- to six-year-olds the chance to fulfil their greatest ambitions in the adult world, whether running a photographic studio, a radio station or an ice-cream van. The show was executively produced by Lisa Perrin and Tess Cumming.

In April 2010, Tarrant become one of the first three celebrities to be subjected to the British version of the American institution of a comedy roast, on Channel 4's A Comedy Roast.In August 2010, Tarrant launched the Fishing with Chris Tarrant application for iOS devices in association with Angling Times magazine. Also in 2010 he presented ITV1's The Door, a game show in which celebrities faced unpleasant and scary challenges to win money for charity.

In January 2011, he appeared on BBC's The Magicians and was voted to do the forfeit trick (walking barefoot on broken glass and swords)

Tarrant has sat in for Steve Wright on his BBC Radio 2 show on at least ten occasions between 2010 and 2013.

On 13 April 2012, Tarrant made an appearance in the BBC show Would I Lie to You? on David Mitchell's team alongside Mel Giedroyc.

In 2012, Tarrant filmed the Chris Tarrant: Extreme Railways series for Channel 5, with locations including the Congo-Ocean Railway, the Ghan across Australia and the Konkan Railway in India. The series was aired in December 2012. A second series was shown in 2015. In 2013, Channel 5 aired a new series called Chris Tarrant Goes Fishing. A year later Tarrant began appearing in the ITV daytime game show Show Me the Telly as the TV legends team captain.

Since 2014, Tarrant has been a brand ambassador and has appeared in commercials for Lottoland.

In 2017, Tarrant became a continuity announcer for the TV channel Challenge.

On 25 April 2022, Tarrant released his book It's Not A Proper Job: Stories from 50 Years in TV.

Personal life

Tarrant had two children from his marriage to Sheila Roberton, Helen in 1977 and Jennifer in 1980. The couple married in Southend-on-Sea in 1976 and divorced in 1982. Tarrant met his second wife, Ingrid Dupre-Walsh, when they both worked for TV-am. The couple married in 1991 and divorced in 2007. After a series of tabloid stories, on 18 September 2006 the couple announced that they were separating. The couple previously lived with their two children, Sammy and Toby, in Esher, plus two children from Ingrid's previous marriage, Dexter and Fia, the latter a radio presenter with Heart. In a statement in September 2006, Tarrant said: "I am deeply sorry for the hurt I have caused to my loyal wife and wonderful children, all of whom I adore. I have only myself to blame for the breakdown of my marriage." Since 2008, Tarrant has been in a long-term relationship with legal assistant Jane Bird.

In June 2000, Tarrant's River Thames launch boat the Ben Gunn was vandalised and burnt at its mooring in East Molesey. Tarrant's father died in 2005 and his mother died in 2012. Whilst Tarrant was preparing for his mother's funeral, he discovered his father's war diary in an open desk. Tarrant stated, "For the first time, I had his own record of his wartime experiences."

On 12 March 2014, it was reported that Tarrant had suffered a mini stroke whilst on board a return flight from Bangkok to London Heathrow on 1 March 2014, returning from overseas shooting for Chris Tarrant: Extreme Railways. Upon landing, he was rushed to Charing Cross Hospital where doctors did emergency surgery to remove a blood clot from his right leg.

Tarrant is a fan of rock group Status Quo, and in 1991 followed them on their Rock 'til You Drop tour, which covered four concerts in one day (Sheffield, Glasgow, Birmingham and London) in aid of Nordorff-Robbins. In 2013, he attended the premiere of the band's feature film Bula Quo! in London.

He is also a supporter of Reading F.C.

Two of Tarrant's children also work in radio, both employed by Global Radio: Toby hosted programmes initially for Capital FM and, as of 2017, for Radio X, and Fia presents on Heart.

Charity work
Tarrant's charity work, for which he received an OBE in 2004, includes: being an ambassador for the homeless charity, Centrepoint; trustee/patron of West Heath School for disadvantaged children (the school previously being a private school for girls that Diana, Princess of Wales attended); patron of Milly's Fund, set up in memory of murdered Surrey teenager Amanda Dowler; patron of Swings & Smiles, a charity for children with special needs.

He was a patron of the Headway Thames Valley, until he left in 2006, blaming "work commitments".

Tarrant is a patron of the Trooper Potts VC Memorial Trust, Reading. As well as Berkshire Vision, a charity that supports the visually impaired in the Berkshire County.

Legal troubles
On 13 May 2007, Tarrant was arrested on suspicion of assault at an Indian restaurant and was released on police bail. The incident took place at the MemSaab Restaurant on Maid Marian Way, Nottingham, where Tarrant, who had been joking with a couple dining at an adjacent table, threw an item of cutlery towards the man. Tarrant admitted to the BBC that he did jokingly "lob" some cutlery onto the couple's table after asking them to leave him alone to discuss work with his colleagues. He said: "I've no idea what his [the accuser's] motives were – it genuinely makes no sense. I got back from the station at 1 am and to this minute I am completely bemused by what happened." On 25 May 2007, Tarrant was formally cautioned by Nottinghamshire Constabulary with regard to the incident.

On 5 March 2009, Tarrant was arrested on suspicion of assault at his home in Esher. He was later released without charge.

On 18 December 2017, Tarrant appeared in court charged with drink-driving. He returned to court on 18 January 2018 and received a £6,000 fine and a 12-month driving ban.

Filmography

Television

Television advertisements

Discography 
Album Tiswas presents The Four Bucketeers
Single "The Bucket of Water Song/Smello"
Single "Water is Wonderful/Raspberry Rock"
Album Saturday Scene
Album Ultimate Party Megamix
Album Ultimate Summer Party

Awards and honours
Tarrant was voted Number 38 in ITV's TV's 50 Greatest Stars list of 2006.

In August 2010, Tarrant was awarded a place on Birmingham's Walk of Stars, and made an honorary citizen of Birmingham. On receiving the award, he said, "I love it here. I'm an honorary Brummie. I owe everything that has happened in my career to my start in Birmingham with ATV and Tiswas. I'm very proud to have my own bit of pavement on Broad Street in Brum."

References

External links

TV Tarrant in the spotlight, BBC News Online, 31 May 1999
Tarrant 'most watched' on TV, BBC News Online, 8 June 2001
About.com's Profile of Chris Tarrant
Tiswas Online
Chris Tarrant soaks ITV's Keith Wilkinson (reporter) 

1946 births
Living people
Alumni of the University of Birmingham
Capital (radio network)
English game show hosts
English radio DJs
English radio presenters
English television presenters
Officers of the Order of the British Empire
People educated at King's School, Worcester
People from Reading, Berkshire
Who Wants to Be a Millionaire?